Polishuk Alexander Valeryevich (born 26 December 1978 in Baku, Azerbaijan) is a professional paralympic athlete.

References

External links
 "Muslimov and Polishuk are leading in the world rankings", November 2, 2016.
 "Azerbaijani team won 9 medals at the European Championships", September 17, 2016.
  "Impossible things are always possible. Alexander Polishuk: "I have never had inferiority complex "", June 1, 2014.

1978 births
Living people
Azerbaijani male taekwondo practitioners
Sportspeople from Baku
21st-century Azerbaijani people